The 1876 North Carolina gubernatorial election was held on November 7, 1876. Democratic nominee Zebulon Baird Vance defeated Republican nominee Thomas Settle with 52.83% of the vote.

Democratic convention
The Democratic convention was held on June 14, 1876.

Candidates
Zebulon Baird Vance, former Governor
David Settle Reid, former United States Senator

Results

Republican convention
The Republican convention was held on July 12, 1876.

Candidates
Thomas Settle, former United States Envoy Extraordinary and Minister Plenipotentiary to Peru
Oliver H. Dockery, former U.S. Representative

Results

General election

Candidates
Zebulon Baird Vance, Democratic
Thomas Settle, Republican

Results

References

1876
North Carolina
Gubernatorial